Patrick Mikael Lebeau (born March 17, 1970) is a Canadian former professional ice hockey player. He represented Canada at the 1992 Winter Olympics, winning a silver medal.  He has played professionally in the National Hockey League with the Montreal Canadiens, Calgary Flames, Florida Panthers, and Pittsburgh Penguins. He is the younger brother of Stéphan Lebeau.

Career
Lebeau was born in Saint-Jérôme, Quebec. As a youth, he played in the 1983 Quebec International Pee-Wee Hockey Tournament with the Sherbrook Castors minor ice hockey team. He played junior ice hockey from 1986 to 1990 for the Shawinigan Cataractes, the Saint-Jean Castors, and the Victoriaville Tigres. Lebeau joined the Montreal Canadiens in 1990 and played most of the season for their affiliate Fredericton Canadiens.

Lebeau joined the now-defunct Frankfurt Lions for the 2002–03 DEL season and, along with his linemates Jesse Bélanger and Dwayne Norris, was instrumental in the  Lions' surprise 2004 DEL championship; he led the DEL in scoring in 2003–04 and 2004–05. Due to injuries during the following two DEL campaigns he missed a lot of games and left Frankfurt after the 2006–07 season, opting to try out for an NHL club; he eventually received an offer from the Philadelphia Flyers but didn't pass his physical.

In 2008, Lebeau had a tryout with the Füchse Duisburg, but was unsuccessful in gaining a contract with the team and moved to the Vienna Capitals in Austria instead.

Career statistics

Regular season and playoffs

International

Awards
1990–91 - Dudley "Red" Garrett Memorial Award

References

External links

1970 births
Living people
Calgary Flames players
Canadian ice hockey left wingers
Cincinnati Cyclones (IHL) players
Düsseldorfer EG players
Florida Panthers players
Frankfurt Lions players
Fredericton Canadiens players
French Quebecers
Ice hockey people from Quebec
Ice hockey players at the 1992 Winter Olympics
HC La Chaux-de-Fonds players
Medalists at the 1992 Winter Olympics
Montreal Canadiens draft picks
Montreal Canadiens players
Olympic ice hockey players of Canada
Olympic medalists in ice hockey
Olympic silver medalists for Canada
People from Saint-Jérôme
Pittsburgh Penguins players
Saint-Jean Castors players
Saint-Jean Lynx players
Salt Lake Golden Eagles (IHL) players
Shawinigan Cataractes players
Victoriaville Tigres players
Vienna Capitals players
ZSC Lions players
Canadian expatriate ice hockey players in Germany
Canadian expatriate ice hockey players in the United States